The Affiliated States Championship is an annual rugby league competition run by the Australian Rugby League involving the four affiliated states (Victoria, South Australia, Northern Territory and Western Australia) plus the Australian Federal Police and Australian Defence Force.

Following the Championship, a Combined Affiliated States (CAS) representative side is selected from the teams to tour the Pacific islands.

History

The initial Championship had Australian Capital Territory and Newcastle in it because they were the two strongest competitions outside of the Queensland Rugby League and New South Wales Rugby League.

The Championship resumed in 2003 with just the four Affiliated states. The PRLA Australian team joined the competition in 2005.

The Affiliated Championships have over the past few years (2010–2014) been held at Hindmarsh Stadium in Adelaide, however in 2015 they were held in Darwin Northern Territory.

2016 saw the championships return to Adelaide, and were played at Thebarton Oval in Torrensville, with Western Australia winning their seventh consecutive title.

Current States Competing 
South Australia and Tasmania field a joint team as the least developed rugby league states.

Former Teams

Combined Affiliated States
On 20 October 2017, a Combined Affiliated States team played the English national team as a warm-up for the 2017 World Cup. England won 74–12 at Perth Oval.

Men's Open Winners

Women's Winners

Under 18's Winners

Results

2019

Under-18's 
Day 1: Northern Territory U18 34 def Presidents XIII 8, Victoria U18 68 def Western Australia U18 0

Day 2: Presidents XIII 8 lost to Western Australia U18 26, Northern Territory U18 10 lost to Victoria U18 44

Day 3: Presidents XIII 6 lost to Victoria U18 44, Northern Territory U18 10 lost to Western Australia U18 20

Men's Open 
Day 1: Western Australia 46 def South Australia 6, Northern Territory 12 lost to Victoria 26

Day 2: Victoria 40 def South Australia 10, Northern Territory 4 lost to Western Australia 40

Day 3: Northern Territory 32 def South Australia 0, Western Australia 14 lost to Victoria 16

See also

Rugby League Competitions in Australia
Women's National Championship

References

External links

Rugby league competitions in Australia
Recurring sporting events established in 1994
1994 establishments in Australia
Sports leagues established in 1994